April Fronzoni (born February 18, 1982 in Larksville, Pennsylvania) is a field hockey striker from the United States, who earned her first international senior cap versus Ireland on January 14, 2004 at Stanford, California. Fronzoni attended the University of Michigan in Ann Arbor, where she played for the Wolverines.

Fronzoni has been a mainstay in the U.S. system since competing on the junior national team in the late 1990s, and is prone to scoring decisive goals. She gave the senior national team a 1-0 win over New Zealand in the ATA Holdings Champions' Challenge on a penalty corner goal taken after the expiration of the second half.

International senior competitions
 2004 – Olympic Qualifying Tournament, Auckland, New Zealand (6th)
 2004 – Pan American Cup, Bridgetown, Barbados (2nd)
 2006 – World Cup Qualifier, Rome, Italy (4th)
 2006 – World Cup, Madrid (6th)
 2007 – Champions' Challenge, Baku, Azerbaijan

References
 USA Field Hockey

1982 births
Living people
People from Larksville, Pennsylvania
American female field hockey players
Michigan Wolverines field hockey players